Robert Hamilton (December 9, 1809 – March 14, 1878) was an American lawyer, bank president and Democratic Party politician who represented  in the United States House of Representatives from 1873 to 1877.

Early life and career
Born in Hamburg, New Jersey, Hamilton attended common schools as a child. He moved Newton, New Jersey, in 1831, studied law and was admitted to the bar in 1836, commencing practice in Newton.

He was prosecutor of plea for Sussex County, New Jersey, from 1848 to 1858, 1868 and 1869, was a delegate to the 1860 Democratic National Convention, was a member of the New Jersey General Assembly in 1863 and 1864, serving as Speaker of the House, and was president of Merchant’s National Bank from 1865 to 1878.

Congress
Hamilton was elected a Democrat to the United States House of Representatives in 1872, serving from 1873 to 1877. Afterward, he resumed practicing law and was director of the Morris and Essex Railroad. He died in Newton, New Jersey, on March 14, 1878, and was interred in Newton Cemetery in Newton.

Private life
Hamilton and his wife were parishioners at Christ Church, Newton, the town's episcopal parish, and provided substantial financial support for the construction of the church's current house of worship completed in 1869.

References

External links 

 Robert Hamilton at The Political Graveyard
 

1809 births
1878 deaths
Democratic Party members of the New Jersey General Assembly
American prosecutors
New Jersey lawyers
19th-century American railroad executives
People from Hamburg, New Jersey
Democratic Party members of the United States House of Representatives from New Jersey
People from Newton, New Jersey
Politicians from Sussex County, New Jersey
Burials in New Jersey
19th-century American politicians
19th-century American lawyers